Karin Singstad (born 29 December 1958) is a Norwegian team handball player and Olympic medalist. She was born in Trondheim, and represented the club Sverresborg IF. She received a silver medal at the 1988 Summer Olympics in Seoul with the Norwegian national team. She was also part of the Norwegian team that won bronze medals at the 1986 World Women's Handball Championship in the Netherlands. Singstad played 83 matches and scored 33 goals for the Norwegian national handball team between 1984 and 1989.

References

External links

1958 births
Living people
Norwegian female handball players
Olympic silver medalists for Norway
Sportspeople from Trondheim
Olympic medalists in handball
Medalists at the 1988 Summer Olympics
Handball players at the 1988 Summer Olympics